St. Andrew's Public School (SAPS, also known as Bhalerao Public School) is a private, English-medium, co-educational school in Ballarpur, Maharashtra, India. It was established in 1968 and runs under the aegis of the Society for the Education of Youth. It is affiliated to the Maharashtra State Board of Secondary and Higher Secondary Education.

References

External links 
 

High schools and secondary schools in Maharashtra
Private schools in Maharashtra